Aynur Imanova (née Karimova, ; born ) is an Azerbaijani female volleyball player who currently plays for and captains Azerrail Baku in Azerbaijan Superleague.

Imanova has played for Azerbaijan women's national volleyball team since 2006 and has been part of the squad at the 2006 and 2018 FIVB World Championships, as well as 6 editions of the European Championship (2007, 2009, 2011, 2013, 2015, 2017).

Clubs
  Azerrail Baku (2006-2012)
  Azeryol Baku (2012-2014)
  Azerrail Baku (2014-2015)
  Azeryol Baku (2015-2016)
  Azerrail Baku (2016-2018) 
  Absheron VC (2021-2022) 
  Azerrail Baku (2022-present)

References

External links 
CEV profile
FIVB profile
 https://www.teamusa.org/USA-Volleyball/Features/2018/September/28/US-Women-Set-for-Worlds-Opener-vs-Azerbaijan

1994 births
Living people
Azerbaijani women's volleyball players
Sportspeople from Baku
Setters (volleyball)